The 2007 Houston Astros season was the 46th season in team history. After finishing 1½ games behind for the NL Central to the World Series champion St. Louis Cardinals, the Astros elected to a select amount of subtractions and additions to compete. Jeff Bagwell (who had shoulder problems that had him play his last game in 2005) retired after the Astros declined to pick up his $18 million club option for 2007, instead buying it out for $7 million. Pitchers Andy Pettitte and Roger Clemens both filed for free agency on November 6 and re-joined the New York Yankees. To make up for losing those key players, they signed pitcher Woody Williams, and traded with the Colorado Rockies for Jason Jennings and Miguel Asencio. The largest offseason move the Astros made was signing outfielder Carlos Lee to a 6-year contract worth $100 million, the most in franchise history.  On June 28, second baseman Craig Biggio achieved his 3,000th career hit.  The club officially retired Bagwell's jersey number 5 on August 26. On September 30, Biggio played his last game as a major league player, having announced his retirement on July 24.

Offseason
 January 3, 2007:  Signed infielder Mark Loretta would sign a contract worth $2.5 million.
 January 12:  Signed outfielder Richard Hidalgo to a Minor League Baseball contract.
 March 6:  Signed second baseman José Altuve as an amateur free agent.
  March 24:  Released Richard Hildago.

Regular season

Season summary
On April 28, the Astros purchased the contract of Hunter Pence, the organization's top prospect from Triple-A affiliate, and made his debut that night where he got his first career hit and run scored.

By May 2007, the Astros had suffered one of their worst losing streaks since the 1995 season with 10 losses in a row, losing 4–3 to the Cincinnati Reds on May 30. The Astros were just one loss shy of tying their worst skid in franchise history, before snapping that streak the next day, also against the Reds.

On June 12, the Astros beat the Oakland Athletics for the first time in team history.

Longtime Astros second baseman Craig Biggio recorded his 3,000th career hit in the seventh inning against the Colorado Rockies on June 28, becoming the 27th player in MLB history to do so.  Jeff Bagwell, who played first base for the Astros alongside Biggio for 15 seasons, was in the dugout and emerged to congratulate him.  The Astros fans, who had momentarily quieted after cheering Biggio for his achievement, erupted into cheers again the moment Biggio dragged Bagwell onto the playing field and to the first base line. "The thing with Baggy is that he and I worked so hard here for this city and for this organization," Biggio remarked. "We made so many sacrifices as far as playing the game and giving your body to a city, a team."  Together, they bowed to the crowd as Bagwell raised Biggio's arm and returned to the dugout.  In the bottom of the 11th inning of the same game, Carlos Lee hit a towering walk-off grand slam to win the game for the Astros.

On July 24, Biggio announced that he would be retiring at the end of the 2007 season, his 20th season with the club (and a franchise record).  He hit a grand slam in that night's game which broke a 3–3 tie and led to an Astros win.

On July 28, the Astros traded RHP Dan Wheeler to Tampa Bay for right-handed slugger 3B Ty Wigginton and cash considerations.  He is now signed through 2009.  On July 29, long time and former All-Star third baseman Morgan Ensberg was designated for assignment to make room for newly acquired Wigginton.

On August 26, the club officially retired Bagwell's jersey number 5 prior to the start of the game against the Pittsburgh Pirates.  He was the eighth player in Astros history to have his number retired.  Three first bases were used in the game, each embossed with a commemorative insignia that said, "No. 5, Jeff Bagwell jersey retirement, Aug. 26, 2007."  One was given to Bagwell and the other two were auctioned to raise funds on behalf of the Astros in Action Foundation.

On August 27, manager Phil Garner and General Manager Tim Purpura were relieved of their duties. Cecil Cooper and Tal Smith were named as temporary replacements, respectively.

On September 17, in a 6–0 loss to the Brewers the Astros were officially eliminated from the 2007 playoffs.

On September 20, Ed Wade was named as the new General Manager of the Astros. He made his first move as GM by trading Jason Lane to the Padres on September 24.

On September 30, Craig Biggio retired, ending a 20-year career with the Astros.

Season standings

National League Central

Record vs. opponents

Roster

Game log

|- style="background-color:#ffbbbb"
| 1 || April 2 || Pirates || 4 – 2  || Capps (1-0) || Qualls (0-1) || Torres (1) || 43,803 || 0-1
|- style="background-color:#ffbbbb"
| 2 || April 3 || Pirates || 3 – 2 || Bayliss (1-0) || Wheeler (0-1) || Torres (2) || 31,238 || 0-2
|- style="background-color:#ffbbbb"
| 3 || April 4 || Pirates || 5 – 4 || Gorzelanny (1-0) || Williams (0-1) || Torres (3) || 25,961 || 0-3
|- style="background-color:#ffbbbb"
| 4 || April 6 || Cardinals || 4 – 2 || Wainwright (1-0) || Rodríguez (0-1) || Isringhausen (1) || 43,430 || 0-4
|- style="background-color:#bbffbb"
| 5 || April 7 || Cardinals || 5 – 1 || Oswalt (1-0) || Reyes (0-1) || || 41,885 || 1-4
|- style="background-color:#ffbbbb"
| 6 || April 8 || Cardinals || 10 – 1 || Wells (1-1) || Jennings (0-1) || || 36,273 || 1-5
|- style="background-color:#bbffbb"
| 7 || April 9 || @ Cubs || 5 – 3 || Qualls (1-1) || Howry (0-2) || Wheeler (1) || 41,388 || 2-5
|- style="background-color:#bbffbb"
| 8 || April 10 || @ Cubs || 4 – 2 || Sampson (1-0) || Marquis (0-1) || || 35,924 || 3-5
|- style="background-color:#bbbbbb"
| -- || April 11 || @ Cubs || colspan=5|Postponed (snow) || 3-5
|- style="background-color:#bbffbb"
| 9 || April 13 || @ Phillies || 9 – 6 || Oswalt (2-0) || Myers (0-1)|| Wheeler (2) || 44,336 || 4-5
|- style="background-color:#ffbbbb"
| 10 || April 14 || @ Phillies || 8 – 5 || Hamels (1-0) || Williams (0-2) || Gordon (2) || 35,387 || 4-6
|- style="background-color:#bbbbbb"
| -- || April 15 || @ Phillies || colspan=5|Postponed (rain)  || 4-6
|- style="background-color:#bbffbb"
| 11 || April 16 || Marlins || 4 – 3 || Qualls (2-1) || Gregg (0-1) || || 30,665 || 5-6
|- style="background-color:#bbffbb"
| 12 || April 17 || Marlins || 6 – 1 || Oswalt (3-0) || Julio (0-2) || || 38,106 || 6-6
|- style="background-color:#bbffbb"
| 13 || April 18 || @ Reds || 7 – 2 || Sampson (2-0) || Coffey (1-1) || || 13,772 || 7-6
|- style="background-color:#bbffbb"
| 14 || April 19 || @ Reds || 8 – 6 || Lidge (1-0) || Weathers (0-2) || Wheeler (3) || 14,222 || 8-6
|- style="background-color:#bbffbb"
| 15 || April 20 || @ Brewers || 6 – 5 || White (1-0) || Wise (0-1) || Qualls (1) || 41,522 || 9-6
|- style="background-color:#ffbbbb"
| 16 || April 21 || @ Brewers || 6 – 4 || Capuano (3-0) || Rodríguez (0-2) || Cordero (6) || 41,209 || 9-7
|- style="background-color:#ffbbbb"
| 17 || April 22 || @ Brewers || 4 – 3 || Bush (2-1) || Oswalt (3-1) || Cordero (7) || 31,985 || 9-8
|- style="background-color:#ffbbbb"
| 18 || April 23 || @ Phillies|| 11 – 4 || Eaton (2-1) || Sampson (2-1) |||| 32,517 || 9-9
|- style="background-color:#ffbbbb"
| 19 || April 24 || @ Pirates || 3 – 0 || Maholm (1-2) || Williams (0-3) || || 13,062 || 9-10
|- style="background-color:#ffbbbb"
| 20 || April 25 || @ Pirates || 4 – 3  || Wasdin (1-1) || Moehler (0-1) || || 8,201 || 9-11
|- style="background-color:#ffbbbb"
| 21 || April 26 || @ Pirates || 5 – 3 || Bayliss (2-1) || Rodríguez (0-3) || Grabow (1) || 12,056 || 9-12
|- style="background-color:#ffbbbb"
| 22 || April 27 || Brewers || 4 – 1 || Capuano (4-0) || Oswalt (3-2) || Cordero (9) || 40,530 || 9-13
|- style="background-color:#bbffbb"
| 23 || April 28 || Brewers || 10 – 1 || Sampson (3-1) || Bush (2-2) || || 41,004 || 10-13
|- style="background-color:#ffbbbb"
| 24 || April 29 || Brewers || 3 – 1 || Vargas (2-0) || Williams (0-4) || Cordero (10) || 37,114 || 10-14
|- style=""

|- style="background-color:#ffbbbb"
| 25 || May 1 || Reds || 11 – 2 || Arroyo (1-2) || Albers (0-1) || || 30,361 || 10-15
|- style="background-color:#bbffbb"
| 26 || May 2 || Reds || 3 – 1 || Oswalt (4-2) || Lohse (1-2) || Wheeler (4) || 29,468 || 11-15
|- style="background-color:#bbffbb"
| 27 || May 3 || Reds || 7 – 5 || Qualls (3-1) || Stanton (1-1) || Wheeler (5) || 29,931 || 12-15
|- style="background-color:#ffbbbb"
| 28 || May 4 || @ Cardinals || 3 – 2 || Wainwright (2-2) || Williams (0-5) || Isringhausen (7)  || 44,117 || 12-16
|- style="background-color:#bbffbb"
| 29 || May 5 || @ Cardinals || 13 – 0 || Albers (1-1) || Wells (1-6) || || 44,881 || 13-16
|- style="background-color:#ffbbbb"
| 30 || May 6 || @ Cardinals || 3 – 1 || Looper (4-2) || Sampson (3-2) || Isringhausen (8) || 44,453 || 13-17
|- style="background-color:#bbffbb"
| 31 || May 7 || @ Reds || 5 – 4 || Oswalt (5-2) || Lohse (1-3) || Wheeler (6) || 17,362 || 14-17
|- style="background-color:#bbffbb"
| 32 || May 8 || @ Reds || 7 – 6 || Lidge (2-0) || Salmon (0-1) || Wheeler (7) || 16,264 || 15-17
|- style="background-color:#bbffbb"
| 33 || May 9 || @ Reds || 3 – 2 || Williams (1-5) || Belisle (3-2) || Wheeler (8) || 16,278 || 16-17
|- style="background-color:#ffbbbb"
| 34 || May 10 || @ Reds || 9 – 5 || Harang (5-1) || Albers (1-2) || Weathers (7) || 25,796 || 16-18
|- style="background-color:#ffbbbb"
| 35 || May 11 || D-backs || 3 – 1 || Webb (3-2) || Sampson (3-3) || || 36,080 || 16-19
|- style="background-color:#bbffbb"
| 36 || May 12 || D-backs || 10 – 4 ||  Oswalt (6-2)  || Hernández (3-2) || || 36,142 || 17-19
|- style="background-color:#bbffbb"
| 37 || May 13 || D-backs || 5 – 2 || Rodríguez (1-3) || Davis (2-4) || || 37,230 || 18-19
|- style="background-color:#bbffbb"
| 38 || May 15 || Giants || 6 – 5  || Qualls (4-1) || Sánchez (1-1) || || 33,490 || 19-19
|- style="background-color:#bbffbb"
| 39 || May 16 || Giants || 2 – 1 || Sampson (4-3) || Lowry (4-4) ||   || 33,533 || 20-19
|- style="background-color:#ffbbbb"
| 40 || May 17 || Giants || 2 – 1  || Chulk (1-2) || Lidge (1-2) || Benítez (8) || 36,815 || 20-20
|- style="background-color:#ffbbbb"
| 41 || May 18 || Rangers || 7 – 4 || Tejeda (4-3) || Albers (1-3) || Gagné (2) || 37,634 || 20-21
|- style="background-color:#bbffbb"
| 42 || May 19 || Rangers || 6 – 1 || Rodríguez (2-3) || Koronka (0-1) || || 41,990 || 21-21
|- style="background-color:#ffbbbb"
| 43 || May 20 || Rangers || 14 – 1 || McCarthy (4-4) || Williams (1-6) || || 39,938 || 21-22
|- style="background-color:#ffbbbb"
| 44 || May 21 || @ Giants || 4 – 0 || Lowry (5-4) || Sampson (4-4) || || 35,768 || 21-23
|- style="background-color:#ffbbbb"
| 45 || May 22 || @ Giants || 4 – 2 || Lincecum (2-0) || Oswalt (6-3) || Benítez (9) || 35,134 || 21-24
|- style="background-color:#ffbbbb"
| 46 || May 23 || @ Giants || 9 – 1 || Zito (4-5) || Albers (1-4) || || 35,521 || 21-25
|- style="background-color:#ffbbbb"
| 47 || May 24 || @ D-backs || 9 – 1 || Owings (3-1) || Rodríguez (2-4) || || 18,130 || 21-26
|- style="background-color:#ffbbbb"
| 48 || May 25 || @ D-backs || 13 – 3 || González (2-2) || Williams (1-7) || || 23,298 || 21-27
|- style="background-color:#ffbbbb"
| 49 || May 26 || @ D-backs || 5 – 4 || Webb (4-3) || Sampson (4-5) || Valverde (18) || 27,836 || 21-28
|- style="background-color:#ffbbbb"
| 50 || May 27 || @ D-backs || 8 – 4 || Hernández (5-2) || Oswalt (6-4) || || 26,621 || 21-29
|- style="background-color:#ffbbbb"
| 51 || May 29 || Reds || 2 – 1 || Belisle (5-4) || Qualls (4-2) || Weathers (10) || 33,565 || 21-30
|- style="background-color:#ffbbbb"
| 52 || May 30 || Reds || 4 – 3 || Harang (6-2) || Rodríguez (2-5) || || 31,904 || 21-31
|- style="background-color:#bbffbb"
| 53 || May 31 || Reds || 10 – 2 || Williams (2-7) || Arroyo (2-6) || || 30,336 || 22-31
|- style=""

|- style="background-color:#ffbbbb"
| 54 || June 1 || Cardinals || 8 – 1 || Franklin (2-0) || Qualls (4-3) || || 36,784 || 22-32
|- style="background-color:#bbffbb"
| 55 || June 2 || Cardinals || 8 – 3 || Sampson (5-5) || Wells (2-10) || || 39,234 || 23-32
|- style="background-color:#ffbbbb"
| 56 || June 3 || Cardinals || 8 – 6  || Isringhausen (2-0) || Wheeler (0-2) || || 40,483 || 23-33
|- style="background-color:#bbffbb"
| 57 || June 5 || @ Rockies || 4 – 1 || Rodríguez (3-5) || Hirsh (2-6) || Wheeler (10) || 27,101 || 24-33
|- style="background-color:#ffbbbb"
| 58 || June 6 || @ Rockies || 8 – 7 || Buchholz (3-3) || Williams (2-8) || Fuentes (17) || 22,471 || 24-34
|- style="background-color:#ffbbbb"
| 59 || June 7 || @ Rockies || 7 – 6 || Affeldt (3-1) || Wheeler (0-3) || || 22,103 || 24-35
|- style="background-color:#bbffbb"
| 60 || June 8 || @ White Sox || 5 – 2 || Sampson (6-5) || Danks (3-6) || Wheeler (11) || 33,212 || 25-35
|- style="background-color:#bbffbb"
| 61 || June 9 || @ White Sox || 3 – 2 || Qualls (5-3) || Jenks (2-2) || || 36,616 || 26-35
|- style="background-color:#ffbbbb"
| 62 || June 10 || @ White Sox || 6 – 3 || Buehrle (3-3) || Rodríguez (3-6) || Jenks (17) || 33,433 || 26-36
|- style="background-color:#ffbbbb"
| 63 || June 11 || @ Cubs || 2 – 1 || Zambrano (7-5) || Williams (2-9) || Dempster (13) || 37,947 || 26-37
|- style="background-color:#bbffbb"
| 64 || June 12 || Athletics || 5 – 4  || Borkowski (1-0) || Flores (0-1) || || 33,637 || 27-37
|- style="background-color:#ffbbbb"
| 65 || June 13 || Athletics || 7 – 3 || Blanton (6-4) || Wheeler (0-3) || || 34,611 || 27-38
|- style="background-color:#ffbbbb"
| 66 || June 14 || Athletics || 6 – 5  || Embree (1-0) || Moehler (0-2) || Casilla (2) || 42,024 || 27-39
|- style="background-color:#bbffbb"
| 67 || June 15 || Mariners || 5 – 1 || Rodríguez (4-6) || Hernández (3-4) || || 37,322 || 28-39
|- style="background-color:#bbffbb"
| 68 || June 16 || Mariners || 9 – 4 || Williams (3-9) || Baek (3-3) || || 41,974 || 29-39
|- style="background-color:#bbffbb"
| 69 || June 17 || Mariners || 10 – 3 || Oswalt (7-4) || Washburn (5-6) || || 42,019 || 30-39
|- style="background-color:#ffbbbb"
| 70 || June 18 || @ Angels || 10 – 9 || Rodríguez (1-2) || Borkowski (1-1) || || 42,232 || 30-40
|- style="background-color:#bbffbb"
| 71 || June 19 || @ Angels || 9 – 5 || Jennings (1-1) || Colón (6-3) || || 42,156 || 31-40
|- style="background-color:#ffbbbb"
| 72 || June 20 || @ Angels || 8 – 4 || Carrasco (2-1) || Borkowski (1-2) || || 40,761 || 31-41
|- style="background-color:#ffbbbb"
| 73 || June 22 || @ Rangers || 11 – 3 || Millwood (4-6) || Williams (3-10) || || 37,847 || 31-42
|- style="background-color:#ffbbbb"
| 74 || June 23 || @ Rangers || 7 – 2 || Wright (1-1) || Oswalt (7-5) || || 42,315 || 31-43
|- style="background-color:#bbffbb"
| 75 || June 24 || @ Rangers || 12 – 9  || Wheeler (1-4) || Wilson (0-1) || Qualls (2) || 31,560 || 32-43
|- style="background-color:#ffbbbb"
| 76 || June 25 || @ Brewers || 5 – 1 || Sheets (9-3) || Jennings (1-2) || || 28,786 || 32-44
|- style="background-color:#ffbbbb"
| 77 || June 26 || @ Brewers || 11 – 5 || Wise (2-1) || Rodríguez (4-7) || || 30,713 || 32-45
|- style="background-color:#ffbbbb"
| 78 || June 27 || @ Brewers || 6 – 3  || Bush (6-6) || Borkowski (1-3) || || 31,862 || 32-46
|- style="background-color:#bbffbb"
| 79 || June 28 || Rockies || 8 – 5  || Moehler (1-2) || Fuentes (0-3) || || 42,537 || 33-46
|- style="background-color:#bbffbb"
| 80 || June 29 || Rockies || 9 – 8 || Borkowski (2-3) || Fuentes (0-4) || || 42,861 || 34-46
|- style="background-color:#ffbbbb"
| 81 || June 30 || Rockies || 5 – 0 || Francis (8-5) || Jennings (1-3) || || 43,071 || 34-47
|- style=""

|- style="background-color:#bbffbb"
| 82 || July 1 || Rockies || 12 – 0 || Rodríguez (5-7) || López (4-2) || || 35,260 || 35-47
|- style="background-color:#bbffbb"
| 83 || July 2 || Phillies || 7 – 5 || Williams (4-10) || Moyer (7-6) || Miller (1) || 28,973 || 36-47
|- style="background-color:#bbffbb"
| 84 || July 3 || Phillies || 5 – 4  || Albers (2-4) || Mesa (0-1) || || 37,997 || 37-47
|- style="background-color:#ffbbbb"
| 85 || July 4 || Phillies || 8 – 3 || Hamels (10-4) || Sampson (6-6) || || 39,993 || 37-48
|- style="background-color:#ffbbbb"
| 86 || July 5 || Mets || 6 – 2 || Maine (10-4) || Jennings (1-4) || || 35,430 || 37-49
|- style="background-color:#bbffbb"
| 87 || July 6 || Mets || 4 – 0 || Rodríguez (6-7) || Pelfrey (0-7) || || 38,812 || 38-49
|- style="background-color:#ffbbbb"
| 88 || July 7 || Mets || 5 – 3  || Sele (2-0) || Moehler (1-3) || Wagner (17) || 41,596 || 38-50
|- style="background-color:#bbffbb"
| 89 || July 8 || Mets || 8 – 3 || Oswalt (8-5) || Williams (0-1) || || 40,708 || 39-50
|- style="background-color:#ffbbbb"
| 90 || July 13 || @ Cubs || 6 – 0 || Zambrano (11-7) || Jennings (1-5) || || 41,593 || 39-51
|- style="background-color:#ffbbbb"
| 91 || July 14 || @ Cubs || 9 – 3 || Lilly (9-4) || Oswalt (8-6) || || 41,448 || 39-52
|- style="background-color:#ffbbbb"
| 92 || July 15 || @ Cubs || 7 – 6 || Wuertz (2-2) || Rodríguez (6-8) || Howry (5) || 41,757 || 39-53
|- style="background-color:#ffbbbb"
| 93 || July 16 || @ Nationals || 4 – 3 || Rivera (4-2) || Williams (4-11) || Cordero (16) || 22,392 || 39-54
|- style="background-color:#bbffbb"
| 94 || July 17 || @ Nationals || 4 – 2 || Sampson (7-6) || Redding (1-2) || Lidge (1) || 22,362 || 40-54
|- style="background-color:#ffbbbb"
| 95 || July 18 || @ Nationals || 7 – 6 || Bergmann (2-5) || Jennings (1-6) || Cordero (17) || 27,119 || 40-55
|- style="background-color:#bbffbb"
| 96 || July 20 || @ Pirates || 2 – 1 || Oswalt (9-6) || Gorzelanny (9-5) || Lidge (2) || 33,541 || 41-55
|- style="background-color:#ffbbbb"
| 97 || July 21 || @ Pirates || 7 – 3 || Maholm (6-12) || Rodríguez (6-9) || || 32,068 || 41-56
|- style="background-color:#bbffbb"
| 98 || July 22 || @ Pirates || 1 – 0 || Williams (5-11) || Youman (2-2) || Lidge (3) || 22,404 || 42-56
|- style="background-color:#ffbbbb"
| 99 || July 23 || Dodgers || 10 – 2 || Billingsley (7-0) || Sampson (7-7) || || 38,245 || 42-57
|- style="background-color:#bbffbb"
| 100 || July 24 || Dodgers || 7 – 4 || Jennings (2-6) || Seánez (6-2) || Lidge (4)|| 38,247 || 43-57
|- style="background-color:#bbffbb"
| 101 || July 25 || Dodgers || 2 – 1 || Qualls (6-3) || Houlton (0-2) || Lidge (5)|| 31,498 || 44-57
|- style="background-color:#bbffbb"
| 102 || July 26 || Padres || 7 – 1 || Rodríguez (7-9) || Wells (5-7) || || 33,718 || 45-57
|- style="background-color:#ffbbbb"
| 103 || July 27 || Padres || 9 – 4 || Peavy (10-5) || Williams (5-12) || || 39,996 || 45-58
|- style="background-color:#bbffbb"
| 104 || July 28 || Padres || 3 – 1 || Oswalt (10-6) || Maddux (7-8) || Lidge (6) || 42.651 || 46-58
|- style="background-color:#ffbbbb"
| 105 || July 29 || Padres || 18 – 11 || Brocail (3-1) || Jennings (2-7) || || 39,350 || 46-59
|- style="background-color:#ffbbbb"
| 106 || July 31 || @ Braves || 12 – 4 || James (9-8) || Sampson (7-8) || || 32,315 || 46-60
|- style=""

|- style="background-color:#ffbbbb"
| 107 || August 1|| @ Braves || 12 – 3 || Carlyle (6-3) || Rodríguez (7-10) || || 30,785 || 46-61
|- style="background-color:#bbffbb"
| 108 || August 2|| @ Braves || 12 – 11  || McLemore (1-0) || Villarreal (1-1) || Moehler (1) || 35,659 || 47-61
|- style="background-color:#bbffbb"
| 109 || August 3|| @ Marlins || 8 – 2 || Oswalt (11-6) || Willis (7-11) || || 15,226 || 48-61
|- style="background-color:#ffbbbb"
| 110 || August 4|| @ Marlins || 6 – 5  || Gardner (3-2) || Randolph (0-1) || || 22,112 || 48-62
|- style="background-color:#ffbbbb"
| 111 || August 5|| @ Marlins || 6 – 5 || Olsen (9-9) || Albers (2-5) || Gregg (23) || 14,622 || 48-63
|- style="background-color:#bbffbb"
| 112 || August 6 || Cubs || 2 – 1  || Lidge (3-1) || Wuertz (2-3) || || 36,459 || 49-63
|- style="background-color:#bbffbb"
| 113 || August 7 || Cubs || 5 – 2 || Williams (6-12) || Marshall (5-6) || Lidge (7) || 37,561 || 50-63
|- style="background-color:#bbffbb"
| 114 || August 8 || Cubs || 8 – 2 || Oswalt (12-6) || Zambrano (14-8) || || 41,655 || 51-63
|- style="background-color:#ffbbbb"
| 115 || August 10 || Brewers || 5 – 4  || Spurling (2-1) || Moehler (1-4) || Cordero (35) || 40,211 || 51-64
|- style="background-color:#ffbbbb"
| 116 || August 11 || Brewers || 7 – 4 || Linebrink (4-3) || Lidge (3-2) || Cordero (36) || 41,461 || 51-65
|- style="background-color:#bbffbb"
| 117 || August 12 || Brewers || 6 – 4 || McLemore (2-0) || Villanueva (6-3) || Lidge (8) || 43,578 || 52-65
|- style="background-color:#bbffbb"
| 118 || August 13 || @ Dodgers || 4 – 1 || Oswalt (13-6) || Billingsley (7-4) || Qualls (3) || 49,511 || 53-65
|- style="background-color:#bbffbb"
| 119 || August 14 || @ Dodgers || 7 – 4 || Albers (3-5) || Tomko (2-10) || Lidge (9) || 49,399 || 54-65
|- style="background-color:#ffbbbb"
| 120 || August 15 || @ Dodgers || 6 – 3 || Penny (14-3) || Jennings (2-8) || Saito (30) || 49,098 || 54-66
|- style="background-color:#ffbbbb"
| 121 || August 16 || @ Dodgers || 6 – 2 || Lowe (9-11) || Rodríguez (7-11) || Saito (31) || 48,128 || 54-67
|- style="background-color:#bbffbb"
| 122 || August 17 || @ Padres || 3 – 1 || Williams (7-12) || Bell (5-4) || Lidge (10) || 32,063 || 55-67
|- style="background-color:#bbffbb"
| 123 || August 18 || @ Padres || 3 – 2 || Borkowski (3-3) || Germano (6-7) || Lidge (11) || 44,272 || 56-67
|- style="background-color:#ffbbbb"
| 124 || August 19 || @ Padres || 5 – 3 || Maddux (9-9) || Albers (3-6) || Hoffman (31) || 37,628 || 56-68
|- style="background-color:#ffbbbb"
| 125 || August 20 || Nationals || 7 – 0 || Redding (3-3) || Jennings (2-9) || || 30,374 || 56-69
|- style="background-color:#ffbbbb"
| 126 || August 21 || Nationals || 11 – 6 || Hanrahan (3-1) || Rodríguez (7-12) || || 34,073 || 56-70
|- style="background-color:#bbffbb"
| 127 || August 22 || Nationals || 3 – 2 || Williams (8-12) || Bacsik (5-7) || Lidge (12) || 32,023 || 57-70
|- style="background-color:#ffbbbb"
| 128 || August 23 || Nationals || 7 – 6 || Lannan (2-2) || Gutiérrez (0-1) || Cordero (28) || 36,407 || 57-71
|- style="background-color:#ffbbbb"
| 129 || August 24 || Pirates || 8 – 3  || Youman (3-4) || Driskill (0-1) || || 41,403 || 57-72
|- style="background-color:#ffbbbb"
| 130 || August 25 || Pirates || 4 – 1 || Morris (8-8)  || Patton (0-1) || Capps (13) || 41,109 || 57-73
|- style="background-color:#bbffbb"
| 131 || August 26 || Pirates || 5 – 4 || McLemore (3-0) || Chacón (4-4) || Lidge (13) || 42,564 || 58-73
|- style="background-color:#ffbbbb"
| 132 || August 28 || Cardinals || 7 – 0 || Looper (11-10) || Williams (8-13)  || || 37,915 || 58-74
|- style="background-color:#bbffbb"
| 133 || August 29 || Cardinals || 7 – 0 || Oswalt (14-6) || Wells (6-15) || || 33,422 || 59-74
|- style="background-color:#bbffbb"
| 134 || August 30 || Cardinals || 2 – 1 || Albers (4-6) || Piñeiro (4-3) || Lidge (14) || 37,520 || 60-74
|- style="background-color:#bbffbb"
| 135 || August 31 || @ Cubs || 6 – 1 || Rodríguez (8-12) || Marshall (7-7) || || 41,297 || 61-74
|- style=""

|- style="background-color:#ffbbbb"
| 136 || September 1 || @ Cubs || 4 – 3 || Marquis (11-8) || Patton (0-2) || Dempster (24) || 40,606 || 61-75
|- style="background-color:#ffbbbb"
| 137 || September 2 || @ Cubs || 6 – 5 || Mármol (5-1) || Qualls (6-4) || Dempster (25) || 41,415 || 61-76
|- style="background-color:#bbffbb"
| 138 || September 3 || @ Brewers || 9 – 7 || Borkowski (4-3) || Aquino (0-1) || Qualls (4) || 31,226 || 62-76
|- style="background-color:#ffbbbb"
| 139 || September 4 || @ Brewers || 5 – 3 || Villanueva (7-3) || Backe (0-1) || Cordero (40) || 25,854 || 62-77
|- style="background-color:#ffbbbb"
| 140 || September 5 || @ Brewers || 14 – 2 || Gallardo  (7-4) || Albers (4-7) || || 28,988 || 62-78
|- style="background-color:#ffbbbb"
| 141 || September 7 || @ Mets || 11 – 3 || Pelfrey (2-7) || Rodríguez (8-13) || || 51,113 || 62-79
|- style="background-color:#ffbbbb"
| 142 || September 8 || @ Mets || 3 – 1 || Glavine (13-6) || Williams (8-14) || Wagner (31) || 53,061 || 62-80
|- style="background-color:#ffbbbb"
| 143 || September 9 || @ Mets || 4 – 1 || Martínez (2-0) || Oswalt (14-7) || Wagner (32) || 51,847 || 62-81
|- style="background-color:#bbffbb"
| 144 || September 11 || Cubs || 5 – 4  || Lidge (4-2) || Dempster (2-6) || || 33,493 || 63-81
|- style="background-color:#ffbbbb"
| 145 || September 12 || Cubs || 3 – 2 || Hill (9-8) || Albers (4-8) || Dempster (26) || 33,115 || 63-82
|- style="background-color:#ffbbbb"
| 146 || September 13 || Cubs || 6 – 2 || Trachsel (7-10) || Williams (8-15) || || 34,234 || 63-83
|- style="background-color:#ffbbbb"
| 147 || September 14 || Pirates || 4 – 3 || Sánchez (1-0) || Qualls (6-5) || Capps (17) || 35,352 || 63-84
|- style="background-color:#bbffbb"
| 148 || September 15 || Pirates || 9 – 7 || Gutiérrez (1-1) || Morris (9-10) || Lidge (15) || 40,425 || 64-84
|- style="background-color:#bbffbb"
| 149 || September 16 || Pirates || 15 – 3 || Backe (1-1) || Maholm (10-15) || || 35,715 || 65-84
|- style="background-color:#ffbbbb"
| 150 || September 17 || Brewers || 6 – 0 || Gallardo (9-4) || Albers (4-9) || || 32,578 || 65-85
|- style="background-color:#ffbbbb"
| 151 || September 18 || Brewers || 9 – 1 || Vargas (11-4) || Paulino (0-1) || || 32,866 || 65-86
|- style="background-color:#bbffbb"
| 152 || September 19 || Brewers || 5 – 4  || Lidge (5-2) || Wise (3-2) || || 36,981 || 66-86
|- style="background-color:#bbffbb"
| 153 || September 20 || @ Cardinals || 18 – 1 || Rodríguez (9-13) || Looper (12-11) || || 42,171 || 67-86
|- style="background-color:#bbffbb"
| 154 || September 21 || @ Cardinals || 6 – 3 || Backe (2-1) || Piñeiro (6-5) || Lidge (16) || 43,677 || 68-86
|- style="background-color:#ffbbbb"
| 155 || September 22 || @ Cardinals || 7 – 4 || Thompson (7-6) || Albers (4-10) || Isringhausen (30) || 46,237 || 68-87
|- style="background-color:#ffbbbb"
| 156 || September 23 || @ Cardinals || 4 – 3 || Jiménez (3-0) || Lidge (5-3) || || 46,169 || 68-88
|- style="background-color:#bbffbb"
| 157 || September 25 || @ Reds || 8 – 5 || Paulino (1-1) || Coutlangus (4-2) || Lidge (17) || 13,261 || 69-88
|- style="background-color:#bbffbb"
| 158 || September 26 || @ Reds || 7 – 6 || Sarfate (1-0) || Burton (4-2) || Qualls (5) || 13,138 || 70-88
|- style="background-color:#bbffbb"
| 159 || September 27 || @ Reds || 4 – 3 || Borkowski (5-3) || Majewski (0-4) || Lidge (18) || 13,626 || 71-88
|- style="background-color:#ffbbbb"
| 160 || September 28 || Braves || 7 – 2 || Reyes (2-2) || Albers (4-11) || || 43,011 || 71-89
|- style="background-color:#bbffbb"
| 161 || September 29 || Braves || 3 – 2 || Backe (3-1) || Bennett (2-1) || Lidge (19) || 43,624 || 72-89
|- style="background-color:#bbffbb"
| 162 || September 30 || Braves || 3 – 0 || Paulino (2-1) || Carlyle (8-7) || Borkowski (1) || 43,823 || 73-89

Player stats

Batting

Starters by position
Note: Pos = Position; G = Games played; AB = At bats; H = Hits; Avg. = Batting average; HR = Home runs; RBI = Runs batted in

Other batters
Note: G = Games played; AB = At bats; H = Hits; Avg. = Batting average; HR = Home runs; RBI = Runs batted in

Pitching

Starting pitchers
Note: G = Games pitched; IP = Innings pitched; W = Wins; L = Losses; ERA = Earned run average; SO = Strikeouts

Other pitchers
Note: G = Games pitched; IP = Innings pitched; W = Wins; L = Losses; ERA = Earned run average; SO = Strikeouts

Relief pitchers
Note: G = Games pitched; W = Wins; L = Losses; SV = Saves; ERA = Earned run average; SO = Strikeouts

Milestones
 Craig Biggio: 3,000 hit club (June 28)

Awards
 Roberto Clemente Award: Craig Biggio
 Silver Slugger Award at outfield:  Carlos Lee

Farm system

References

External links
Game Logs:
1st Half: Houston Astros Game Log on ESPN.com
2nd Half: Houston Astros Game Log on ESPN.com
Batting Statistics: Los Houston Astros  Batting Stats on ESPN.com
Pitching Statistics: Houston Astros Pitching Stats on ESPN.com
2007 Houston Astros at Baseball Reference

Houston Astros seasons
Houston Astros season
2007 in sports in Texas